Kwasi is an Akan day name given in Ghana to a boy born on a Sunday (Kwasiada). Notable people with this name include:
Kwasi Sintim Aboagye, Ghanaian teacher, businessman and politician of the 1950s and 1960s
Kwasi Kwarfo Adarkwa, Ghanaian academic, Vice Chancellor of the Kwame Nkrumah University of Science and Technology 2006–2010
Kwasi Boateng Adjei (born 1954), Ghanaian politician
Kwasi Ameyaw-Cheremeh (born 1966), Ghanaian politician
Kwasi Anin-Yeboah (born 1953), Ghanaian lawyer and Chief Justice
Kwasi Annoh Ankama (1957–2010), Ghanaian lawyer and politician
Kwasi Sainti Baffoe-Bonnie (1950–2021), Ghanaian media administrator and politician
Kwasi Boachi (1827–1904), Dutch mining engineer, Prince of Ashanti Empire
Kwasi Kyei Darwkah (born 1965), Ghanaian broadcaster
Kwasi Danquah III (born 1986), Ghanaian-British businessman, music executive known as Tinchi Stryder
Kwasi Donsu (born 1995), Ghanaian footballer
Kwasi Etu-Bonde, Ghanaian politician
Kwasi Agyemang Gyan-Tutu (born 1957), Ghanaian politician
Kwasi James (born 1995), Bermudian cricketer
Kwasi Konadu, Jamaican-American author, scholar, educator, writer, editor, and historian
Kwasi Kwarteng (born 26 May 1975), British Conservative Party politician
Kwasi Jones Martin, English songwriter and producer also known as Eddie Martin
Kwasi Obiri-Danso, Ghanaian biological scientist and academic
Kwasi Opoku-Amankwa, Ghanaian academic and civil servant
Kwasi Owusu (1945–2020), Ghanaian footballer
Kwasi Owusu-Yeboa, Ghanaian politician and diplomat
Kwasi Poku, Canadian soccer player
Kwasi Sibo (born 1998), Ghanaian footballer
Kwasi Songui, Canadian actor
Kwasi Wiredu (born 1931), Ghanaian philosopher
 Kwasi Okyere Wriedt (born 1994), Ghanaian footballer

See also 

 Akwasi (alternative spelling)
 Akosua (female version)
 
 Kwasi Buokrom, town in Brong Ahafo Region, Ghana

Akan given names